Dowgar (also Romanized as Dūgar and Dūger; also known as Dogar and Dyugar) is a village in Sanjabad-e Jonubi Rural District, Firuz District, Kowsar County, Ardabil Province, Iran. At the 2006 census, its population was 127, in 24 families.

References 

Tageo

Towns and villages in Kowsar County